Dysdercus concinnus, known generally as the pale red bug or Turk's cap red bug, is a species of red bug in the family Pyrrhocoridae. It is found in Central America, North America, and South America.

References

External links

 

Pyrrhocoridae
Articles created by Qbugbot
Insects described in 1861